The Men's épée competition at the 2019 World Fencing Championships was held on 19 July 2019. The qualification was held on 16 July.

Draw

Finals

Top half

Section 1

Section 2

Bottom half

Section 3

Section 4

References

External links
Bracket

Men's épée